Veronica gentianoides, the gentian speedwell, is a species of flowering perennial plant in the family Plantaginaceae found in the Middle East, from Turkey to Iran.

Description

Veronica gentianoides grows from spreading above-ground rhizomes, eventually forming a mat of glossy green leaves, grouped into rosettes. The species is very variable.

Cultivation

It is grown in temperate climates as an ornamental plant, particularly by alpine gardeners. Some cultivars are available, including 'Nana' (which may just be a smaller high altitude form), 'Variegata' which has leaves marked with white, and 'Tissington White', which has very pale flowers.

References

gentianoides
Taxa named by Martin Vahl